Both the men's and the women's field hockey competitions at the 2018 South American Games were the third inclusion of hockey at the South American Games. Both tournaments were held in conjunction with one another between 29 May – 7 June 2018 at Estadio Félix Capriles in Cochabamba, Bolivia.

The top two teams in each tournament will qualify for the 2019 Pan American Games in Lima, Peru.

Participating nations

Men's tournament

Women's tournament

Medal summary

Medal table

Men's tournament

Preliminary round

Pool A

Pool B

Fifth to eighth place classification

5–8th place semi-finals

7th & 8th place

5th & 6th place

Medal round

Semi-finals

Bronze medal match

Gold medal match

Final standings

Women's tournament

Preliminary round

Pool A

Pool B

Fifth to seventh place classification

First to fourth place classification

Semi-finals

Bronze medal match

Gold medal match

Final standings

References

2018 South American Games events
South American Games
2018
Qualification tournaments for the 2019 Pan American Games